Coney Island is a small island in the San Joaquin River delta, in California. It is part of Contra Costa County, and managed by Reclamation District 2117. It appears on a 1978 United States Geological Survey map of the area.

References

Islands of Contra Costa County, California
Islands of the Sacramento–San Joaquin River Delta
Islands of Northern California